Lucky Seven  is a 2012 Japanese television drama broadcast by Fuji Television from January 16 to March 19, 2012. It stars Jun Matsumoto and Eita.

Cast
 Shuntaro Tokita (Jun Matsumoto)
 Teru Nitta (Eita Nagayama)
 Toko Fujisaki (Nanako Matsushima)
 Ryu Makabe (Shosuke Tanihara)
 Junpei Asahi (Yo Oizumi)
 Asuka Mizuno (Riisa Naka)
 Yuki Kirihara (Kazue Fukiishi)
 Mei Kayano (Mari Iriki)
 Kojiro Tokita (Keiichiro Koyama)
 Masashi Goto (Akio Kaneda)
 Yuriko Tokita (Kumiko Okae)
 Masayoshi Tsukushi (Kazuko Kadono)

Guests
 Kenji Mizuhashi - Takumi Matsuura (ep.1)
 Yurie Midori - Mana Matsuura (ep.1)
 Wakana Matsumoto - Mika (ep.1)
 Lily Franky - Mitsuo Sasaoka (ep.2)
 Shingo Tsurumi - Minegishi (ep.2)
 Mahiru Konno - Shakou Okamoto (ep.3)
 Toshihide Tonesaku - Kazunori Minowa (ep.3)
 Taro Omiya - Kenichi Mineei (ep.4-5)
 Bokuzo Masana - Hiroshi Hayashibara (ep.4-5)
 Mayuko Nishiyama - Shinsuko Nitta (ep.5)
 Kisuke Iida - Tamotsu Kobayashi (ep.6)
 Toru Nomaguchi - Takashi Shikishima (ep.6)
 Noriko Nakagoshi - Youko Chisaki (ep.7)
 Asami Tano - Satoko Yamashita (ep.7)
 Kumi Mizuno - Tome Nakamura (ep.7)
 Yumiko Shaku - Tsukiko Iizuka (ep.8)
 Yasuyuki Maekawa - Shinsaku Tachifuji (ep.8)
 Yoshihiko Hosoda - Makoto Shindo (ep.8)
 Takeshi Kaga - Keisuke Yagami (ep.9-10)
 Kaho - Shiori Mochizuki (ep.9-10)
 Masaru Nagai - mysterious man (ep.9-10)
 Erika Okuda - Yukari Makitani (ep.9-10)
 Akira Otaka - Masato Fujisaki (ep.9-10)

Episodes
 The freshman detective is given his first mission from the boss!
 Investigate the genius researcher
 Catch that romance scammer
 The tempting trap
 Premonition of a separation, running through the night
 The first and worst! case
 When you fall in love...
 The scandal of the beautiful hostess!
 The trap called love
 Friends forever!

See also
 Fuji Television
 List of Japanese television dramas

External links
 Official website 
 

2012 Japanese television series debuts
2012 Japanese television series endings
Japanese drama television series
Fuji TV dramas
Television shows written by Yumiko Inoue
Works by Akiko Nogi